Miuchi is a Japanese surname. Notable people with the surname include:

Suzue Miuchi (born 1951), Japanese artist and author
Takuro Miuchi (born 1975), Japanese rugby union player

Japanese-language surnames